Rashna Bhandari is Head, Laboratory of Cell Signalling at the Centre for DNA Fingerprinting and Diagnostics, Hyderabad. Bhandari is pursuing her study on signal transduction in biological systems, with particular emphasis on understanding the role of inositol pyrophosphates in physiology and metabolism.

Education
Bhandari obtained her bachelor's degree in Human Biology from the All India Institute of Medical Sciences, followed by post graduation and doctorate in Biological Sciences from the Indian Institute of Science.

Career
Bhandari joined Centre for DNA Fingerprinting and Diagnostics in 2008 as a Staff Scientist.

Post her doctorate at Indian Institute of Science, Bhandari worked with Sandhya Srikant Visweswariah on signal transduction by the membrane-bound guanylyl cyclase, GCC, which is involved in maintaining fluid and ion homeostasis across the intestinal membrane.

In 2001, Bhandari joined John Kuriyan laboratory at the University of California, Berkeley as a post-doctoral fellow to work on the structural biology and biochemistry of proteins involved in cell signaling.
In 2003, Bhandari relocated to the Johns Hopkins School of Medicine in Baltimore, where she worked with Solomon Snyder on deciphering the role of inositol pyrophosphates as signalling molecules.

In 2015, a group led by Bhandari found that mice with lower levels of IP7 show reduced blood clotting.  Inadequate levels of IP7 led to reduction in another phosphate-rich molecule called polyphosphate (a long chain of phosphate groups linked to each other). In mammals, polyphosphate is predominantly found in platelets and helps in strengthening blood clots during their formation. Polyphosphates housed inside platelets break up during clotting. These polyphosphates and other components get released to form a mesh that constitutes the basic structure for clot. Lowering IP7 levels could have potential applications in the prevention of stroke or myocardial infarction by reducing clotting.

Bhandari believes that ambition leads to success and not gender.

Publications

References

Year of birth missing (living people)
Living people
20th-century Indian biologists
Scientists from Hyderabad, India
Indian women biologists
20th-century Indian women scientists